Dochfour (or Douchfour) was launched in March 1810 at Bristol. She sent much of her career as a West Indiaman, sailing between Bristol and Grenada. She was wrecked in October 1846.

Career
Dochfour was the first vessel launched at Bristol after the completion of the Floating Harbour in 1809.

Dockfour first appeared in Lloyd's Register (LR} in the volume for 1810.

On 11 August 1813  was off Lundy capturing vessels from the homeward bound Leeward Islands Fleet. Dochfour, Baillie, master, was able to escape by using a stratagem. Knowing that he had no chance of escaping, Baillie hoisted a naval ensign and steered towards Argus. Argus was more interested in commerce raiding than combat and sailed towards the other merchantmen. A few days later, on 14 August,  found Argus and captured her after a severe engagement.

On 25 June 1823 Maria, Williams, master, from Jamaica, and Dochfour, Bailey, master, from Grenada, ran on shore in the River Avon, Bristol. Maria was stuck in the mud near the entrance to the Basin. However, Dochfour was further down the river and in a more dangerous situation. Both were got off that night on the next tide, Dochfour with the assistance of HM cutter .
 
During a severe gale on 20 June 1835 at Quebec, Dochfour ran foul of Favorite. Both sustained some damage.

Fate
Dochfour was wrecked on 23 October 1846 on Cape Bon Ann, Maine, United States. Her crew were rescued. She was on a voyage from Bristol to Quebec City.

Citations and references
Citations

References
 
 
 

1810 ships
Ships built in Bristol
Age of Sail merchant ships of England
Maritime incidents in October 1846